HMS Invincible was a 74-gun third-rate ship of the line of the Royal Navy, launched on 9 March 1765 at Deptford. Invincible was built during a period of peace to replace ships worn out in the recently concluded Seven Years' War. The ship went on to serve in the American War of Independence. May, 1778 under command of Capt. Anthony Parry. Fought at the battles of Cape St Vincent in 1780, and under the command of Captain Charles Saxton, the Battles of the Chesapeake in 1781 and St Kitts in 1782.

She survived the cull of the Navy during the next period of peace, and was present, under the command of Thomas Pakenham, at the Glorious First of June in 1794, where she was badly damaged and lost fourteen men, and, under the command of William Cayley, the Invasion of Trinidad (1797), which resulted in the transfer of Trinidad from the Spanish.

Captains
Captains of the ship included:

 November 1776: Hyde Parker
 February 1778: Anthony Parrey
 1779: John Laforey
 July 1779: Samuel Pitchford Cornish
 April 1780: George Falconer
 February 1781: Richard Bickerton
 May 1781: Charles Saxton
 May 1793: Thomas Pakenham
 December 1795: William Cayley
 February 1801: John Rennie

Shipwreck

On 16 March 1801, she was lost in a shipwreck off the coast of Norfolk, England. She had been sailing from Yarmouth under the flag of Rear-Admiral Thomas Totty in an effort to reach the fleet of Admiral Sir Hyde Parker in the Sound preparing for the upcoming attack on the Danish fleet, with approximately 650 people on board. As the ship passed the Norfolk coast, she was caught in heavy wind and stuck on the Hammond Knoll Rock off Happisburgh, where she was pinned for some hours in the afternoon before breaking free but immediately being grounded on a sandbank, where the effect of wind and waves tore down the masts and began to break up the ship. She remained in that position for all of the following day, but late in the evening drifted off the sandbank and sank in deep water.

The admiral and 195 sailors escaped the wreck, either in one of the ship's boats or were picked up by a passing collier and fishing boat, but over 400 of their shipmates drowned in the disaster, most of them once the ship began to sink in deeper water.

The remains of many of her crew were located by chance in a mass grave in Happisburgh churchyard during the digging of a new drainage channel. A memorial stone was erected in 1998 to their memory by the Ship's Company of the Royal Navy aircraft carrier HMS Invincible, and by the Happisburgh parochial church council.

Notes

References

 Grocott, Terence, Shipwrecks of the Revolutionary & Napoleonic Eras, Caxton Editions, Great Britain: 2002. .
 Michael Phillips. Invincible (74) (1765). Michael Phillips' Ships of the Old Navy. Retrieved 1 September 2008.
 Lavery, Brian (2003) The Ship of the Line – Volume 1: The development of the battlefleet 1650–1850. Conway Maritime Press. .

External links 
 Threedecks database of warships

Military history of Norfolk
Shipwrecks in the North Sea
1801 disasters in the United Kingdom
Ships of the line of the Royal Navy
Shipwrecks of England
Maritime incidents in 1801
1801 in the United Kingdom
Ramillies-class ships of the line
1765 ships
Ships built in England